The Dancing Hut of Baba Yaga is an adventure module for the 2nd edition of the Advanced Dungeons & Dragons fantasy role-playing game.

Plot summary
The Dancing Hut of Baba Yaga is an adventure that features Baba Yaga's dancing hut as its villain, spelling out the hut's powers and immunities.

Publication history
The Dancing Hut of Baba Yaga was written by Lisa Smedman, and published by TSR, Inc.

Reception
Rick Swan reviewed The Dancing Hut of Baba Yaga for Dragon magazine #222 (October 1995). He commented that the dancing hut "remains of one TSR's most durable villains, having boogalooed through a 1976 Dungeons & Dragons game supplement (Eldritch Wizardry), the AD&D Book of Artifacts, and a couple of Dragon Magazine articles." Swan concludes by saying, "Smedman serves up an adventure with an avalanche of adversaries and what seems like an infinite number of rooms. Sure, it's a glorified dungeon crawl, but it's a dungeon crawl of transcendent proportions—how many dungeons do you know that lead to Alternate Reality Tokyo?"

References

Dungeons & Dragons modules
Role-playing game supplements introduced in 1995